"Love Song" is a single by South Korean group Big Bang. It was released on April 8, 2011 by YG Entertainment, as the lead single for their album Big Bang Special Edition (2011), a repackaged version of the extended play (EP) Tonight released earlier on February 23, 2011. The lyrics were written by G-Dragon, T.O.P and Teddy and the music was composed by G-Dragon, Teddy.

Composition
Standing out from BigBang's usual "heavily produced electronic dance tracks", "Love Song" is pop-rock ballad that was compared to Coldplay's early material. The single "utilizes building strings and overlapping vocals to create an uplifting tone despite the otherwise depressing lyrics" and combines "electronic rhythm and modern rock elements to express the nostalgia and agony of a loving woman who left the world." Additionally, the song was noted for its structure that alternates tension and relaxation in a "dreamlike" melody.

Reception
"Love Song" was well received. Billboard named the track BigBang's sixth best song, praising the "excellent vocal performances". The music video ranked as the thirteenth best K-pop video by Stereogum. "Love Song" debuted at number nine on the Gaon Digital Chart. The following week, the single rose to number one on the Digital and Download charts, selling 413,645 copies. On its third week, the song reached the peak position of one in the Streaming chart. On Billboard World Digital Songs, "Love Song" spend two weeks at the second position, the highest peaking entry of the group until "Loser" topped the chart in 2015.

Music Video
The music video was posted on Bigbang's channel on April 13, 2011. In the MV, the Bigbang members walk around a barren land, exempt from piles of rubble and what seems like fire coming from the ground, whilst singing the song, as the camera zooms around abandoned and destroyed cars, broken stop signs, cracked grounds, and telephone poles. Whilst the Bigbang Members are dancing, what seems to be either soot or snow falls, implying that a nuclear apocalypse took place.

Accolades

Charts

Weekly charts

Monthly charts

Year-end charts

Sales

References

External links
 

BigBang (South Korean band) songs
YG Entertainment singles
Korean-language songs
Songs written by G-Dragon
Songs written by T.O.P
Songs written by Teddy Park
Gaon Digital Chart number-one singles
2011 singles
2011 songs
Black-and-white music videos